Astrid Vayson de Pradenne (born 25 October 1985) is a French professional golfer. She joined the Ladies European Tour in 2018 after winning the dual-ranked Jabra Ladies Open.

Career
Vayson de Pradenne started to play golf at the age of 15 and within two years had reached a scratch handicap. She turned professional 2011 and joined the LET Access Series in 2013. She was runner-up at the 2016 Azores Ladies Open behind Jenny Haglund, and in 2017 she lost a playoff to Luna Sobron at the Castellum Ladies Open in Sweden.

Her breakthrough came in 2018 when she, as a member of the LET Access Series, won the Jabra Ladies Open at Evian Resort Golf Club, a dual-ranking event with the LET. She therefore earned a winner's exemption and played in the remainder of the 2018 Ladies European Tour tournaments, including the 2018 Evian Championship at the same course and the 2018 Women's British Open. She finished 31st on the LET Order of Merit.

In 2019, Vayson de Pradenne played in 18 LET tournaments and made 10 cuts. She recorded three top-20 finishes and under pressure managed to retain her tour card by finishing fifth in the season-ending Magical Kenya Ladies Open, to finish 61st on the Order of Merit.

In 2020, she played two tournaments on the Sunshine Ladies Tour, and finished fourth at the Cape Town Ladies Open. She finished tied sixth in the Lacoste Ladies Open de France, five strokes behind winner Julia Engström.

Personal life
De Pradenne graduated from the University of Avignon with an LLM in European Law in 2007, and with a BSc in Physiotherapy from the University of Plymouth (UK) in 2011.

Professional wins (1)

Ladies European Tour wins (1)

^Co-sanctioned with the LET Access Series

Other wins (2)
2016 Open d'Arcachon 
2019 Verbier Cup (Swiss Pro Series)

Results in LPGA majors

CUT = missed the half-way cut
"T" = tied

References

External links

French female golfers
Ladies European Tour golfers
Sportspeople from Avignon
1985 births
Living people
21st-century French women